Olaiyur  is a village in the Srirangam taluk of Tiruchirappalli district in Tamil Nadu, India.

Demographics 

As per the 2001 census, Olaiyur had a population of 1,064 with 521 males and 543 females. The sex ratio was 1042 and the literacy rate, 58.17.

References 

 
Villages in Tiruchirappalli district